The 1987–88 NBA season was the Bullets' 27th season in the NBA and their 15th season in the city of Washington, D.C. After Kevin Loughery was replaced by Wes Unseld during the season, the Bullets finished second in the Atlantic Division with a 38–44 record. In the first round of the playoffs, they lost to the Detroit Pistons in five games. This would be their final playoff appearance until 1997. Following the season, Moses Malone, who was selected for the 1988 NBA All-Star Game, signed as an unrestricted free agent with the Atlanta Hawks.

This season saw the team draft 5'3 Muggsy Bogues with the 12th overall pick in the 1987 NBA draft. He is the shortest player in NBA history. After his rookie season, Bogues left for the 1988 Expansion Draft.

Draft picks

Roster

Regular season

Season standings

Notes
 z, y – division champions
 x – clinched playoff spot

Record vs. opponents

Game log

Regular season

|- align="center" bgcolor="#ffcccc"
| 1
| November 6
| @ Atlanta
| L 97–114
|
|
|
| The Omni
| 0–1
|- align="center" bgcolor="#ffcccc"
| 2
| November 7
| Boston
| L 139–140 (2OT)
|
|
|
| Capital Centre
| 0–2
|- align="center" bgcolor="#ffcccc"
| 3
| November 10
| @ Milwaukee
| L 100–115
|
|
|
| MECCA Arena
| 0–3
|- align="center" bgcolor="#ccffcc"
| 4
| November 13
| New York
| W 108–101
|
|
|
| Capital Centre
| 1–3
|- align="center" bgcolor="#ccffcc"
| 5
| November 15
| @ New Jersey
| W 113–109
|
|
|
| Brendan Byrne Arena
| 2–3
|- align="center" bgcolor="#ffcccc"
| 6
| November 17
| @ Chicago
| L 101–105
|
|
|
| Chicago Stadium
| 2–4
|- align="center" bgcolor="#ffcccc"
| 7
| November 18
| Chicago
| L 82–84
|
|
|
| Capital Centre
| 2–5
|- align="center" bgcolor="#ffcccc"
| 8
| November 20
| @ Portland
| L 101–120
|
|
|
| Memorial Coliseum
| 2–6
|- align="center" bgcolor="#ffcccc"
| 9
| November 21
| @ Seattle
| L 103–124
|
|
|
| Seattle Center Coliseum
| 2–7
|- align="center" bgcolor="#ffcccc"
| 10
| November 24
| @ Utah
| L 83–100
|
|
|
| Salt Palace
| 2–8
|- align="center" bgcolor="#ccffcc"
| 11
| November 25
| @ L.A. Clippers
| W 101–96
|
|
|
| Los Angeles Memorial Sports Arena
| 3–8
|- align="center" bgcolor="#ccffcc"
| 12
| November 28, 19877:30 pm EST
| Detroit
| W 124–102
|
|
|
| Capital Centre13,028
| 4–8

|- align="center" bgcolor="#ffcccc"
| 13
| December 2
| @ Indiana
| L 102–108
|
|
|
| Market Square Arena
| 4–9
|- align="center" bgcolor="#ffcccc"
| 14
| December 3
| Atlanta
| L 94–102
|
|
|
| Capital Centre
| 4–10
|- align="center" bgcolor="#ffcccc"
| 15
| December 5
| Seattle
| L 99–115
|
|
|
| Capital Centre
| 4–11
|- align="center" bgcolor="#ffcccc"
| 16
| December 8
| @ New York
| L 92–116
|
|
|
| Madison Square Garden
| 4–12
|- align="center" bgcolor="#ccffcc"
| 17
| December 9, 19877:30 pm EST
| L.A. Lakers
| W 120–112 (OT)
|
|
|
| Capital Centre18,643
| 5–12
|- align="center" bgcolor="#ffcccc"
| 18
| December 11, 19877:30 pm EST
| @ Detroit
| L 108–114
|
|
|
| Pontiac Silverdome17,884
| 5–13
|- align="center" bgcolor="#ccffcc"
| 19
| December 12
| @ New Jersey
| W 122–107
|
|
|
| Brendan Byrne Arena
| 6–13
|- align="center" bgcolor="#ffcccc"
| 20
| December 15
| Boston
| L 102–122
|
|
|
| Capital Centre
| 6–14
|- align="center" bgcolor="#ccffcc"
| 21
| December 17
| Indiana
| W 115–111 (OT)
|
|
|
| Capital Centre
| 7–14
|- align="center" bgcolor="#ccffcc"
| 22
| December 19
| Chicago
| W 109–96
|
|
|
| Capital Centre
| 8–14
|- align="center" bgcolor="#ffcccc"
| 23
| December 22
| Cleveland
| L 102–106
|
|
|
| Capital Centre
| 8–15
|- align="center" bgcolor="#ffcccc"
| 24
| December 26
| @ Milwaukee
| L 97–102
|
|
|
| MECCA Arena
| 8–16
|- align="center" bgcolor="#ffcccc"
| 25
| December 30
| Portland
| L 112–117
|
|
|
| Capital Centre
| 8–17

|- align="center" bgcolor="#ffcccc"
| 26
| January 1
| Denver
| L 109–124
|
|
|
| Capital Centre
| 8–18
|- align="center" bgcolor="#ffcccc"
| 27
| January 2
| Houston
| L 100–111
|
|
|
| Capital Centre
| 8–19
|- align="center" bgcolor="#ccffcc"
| 28
| January 5
| New Jersey
| W 101–97
|
|
|
| Capital Centre
| 9–19
|- align="center" bgcolor="#ffcccc"
| 29
| January 8
| @ Boston
| L 109–125
|
|
|
| Boston Garden
| 9–20
|- align="center" bgcolor="#ccffcc"
| 30
| January 9
| L.A. Clippers
| W 108–76
|
|
|
| Capital Centre
| 10–20
|- align="center" bgcolor="#ccffcc"
| 31
| January 14
| Milwaukee
| W 136–107
|
|
|
| Capital Centre
| 11–20
|- align="center" bgcolor="#ccffcc"
| 32
| January 17
| Sacramento
| W 130–113
|
|
|
| Capital Centre
| 12–20
|- align="center" bgcolor="#ffcccc"
| 33
| January 18
| @ Chicago
| L 103–117
|
|
|
| Chicago Stadium
| 12–21
|- align="center" bgcolor="#ccffcc"
| 34
| January 20
| @ Philadelphia
| W 110–98
|
|
|
| The Spectrum
| 13–21
|- align="center" bgcolor="#ccffcc"
| 35
| January 22
| Golden State
| W 115–91
|
|
|
| Capital Centre
| 14–21
|- align="center" bgcolor="#ccffcc"
| 36
| January 24
| Philadelphia
| W 131–99
|
|
|
| Capital Centre
| 15–21
|- align="center" bgcolor="#ccffcc"
| 37
| January 25
| Philadelphia
| W 118–117 (OT)
|
|
|
| Capital Centre
| 16–21
|- align="center" bgcolor="#ffcccc"
| 38
| January 27
| @ Boston
| L 100–106
|
|
|
| Boston Garden
| 16–22
|- align="center" bgcolor="#ccffcc"
| 39
| January 28
| New York
| W 104–90
|
|
|
| Capital Centre
| 17–22
|- align="center" bgcolor="#ffcccc"
| 40
| January 30
| @ Cleveland
| L 126–128 (OT)
|
|
|
| Richfield Coliseum
| 17–23

|- align="center" bgcolor="#ffcccc"
| 41
| February 2
| @ New York
| L 106–110
|
|
|
| Madison Square Garden
| 17–24
|- align="center" bgcolor="#ffcccc"
| 42
| February 3
| Cleveland
| L 106–107
|
|
|
| Capital Centre
| 17–25
|- align="center" bgcolor="#ccffcc"
| 43
| February 9
| New Jersey
| W 126–117 (OT)
|
|
|
| Capital Centre
| 18–25
|- align="center" bgcolor="#ffcccc"
| 44
| February 10
| @ Cleveland
| L 102–118
|
|
|
| Richfield Coliseum
| 18–26
|- align="center" bgcolor="#ffcccc"
| 45
| February 13
| @ Atlanta
| L 103–105
|
|
|
| The Omni
| 18–27
|- align="center" bgcolor="#ffcccc"
| 46
| February 15
| Milwaukee
| L 110–114
|
|
|
| Capital Centre
| 18–28
|- align="center" bgcolor="#ffcccc"
| 47
| February 17, 19888:30 pm EST
| @ Dallas
| L 108–123
|
|
|
| Reunion Arena17,007
| 18–29
|- align="center" bgcolor="#ccffcc"
| 48
| February 19
| @ San Antonio
| W 106–102
|
|
|
| HemisFair Arena
| 19–29
|- align="center" bgcolor="#ffcccc"
| 49
| February 20
| @ Houston
| L 109–115
|
|
|
| The Summit
| 19–30
|- align="center" bgcolor="#ffcccc"
| 50
| February 22
| @ Denver
| L 87–100
|
|
|
| McNichols Sports Arena
| 19–31
|- align="center" bgcolor="#ffcccc"
| 51
| February 23, 198810:30 pm EST
| @ L.A. Lakers
| L 100–111
|
|
|
| The Forum17,505
| 19–32
|- align="center" bgcolor="#ccffcc"
| 52
| February 25
| @ Sacramento
| W 129–110
|
|
|
| ARCO Arena
| 20–32
|- align="center" bgcolor="#ccffcc"
| 53
| February 27
| @ Phoenix
| W 116–106
|
|
|
| Arizona Veterans Memorial Coliseum
| 21–32
|- align="center" bgcolor="#ccffcc"
| 54
| February 29
| @ Golden State
| W 110–105
|
|
|
| Oakland–Alameda County Coliseum Arena
| 22–32

|- align="center" bgcolor="#ccffcc"
| 55
| March 2
| Indiana
| W 111–102
|
|
|
| Capital Centre
| 23–32
|- align="center" bgcolor="#ccffcc"
| 56
| March 4
| @ Indiana
| W 95–88
|
|
|
| Market Square Arena
| 24–32
|- align="center" bgcolor="#ccffcc"
| 57
| March 5, 19887:30 pm EST
| Detroit
| W 101–97
|
|
|
| Capital Centre15,656
| 25–32
|- align="center" bgcolor="#ccffcc"
| 58
| March 9
| Phoenix
| W 115–111
|
|
|
| Capital Centre
| 26–32
|- align="center" bgcolor="#ffcccc"
| 59
| March 11
| Utah
| L 107–109
|
|
|
| Capital Centre
| 26–33
|- align="center" bgcolor="#ffcccc"
| 60
| March 13
| @ Philadelphia
| L 96–104
|
|
|
| The Spectrum
| 26–34
|- align="center" bgcolor="#ccffcc"
| 61
| March 14
| San Antonio
| W 112–106
|
|
|
| Capital Centre
| 27–34
|- align="center" bgcolor="#ccffcc"
| 62
| March 16
| Chicago
| W 106–103
|
|
|
| Capital Centre
| 28–34
|- align="center" bgcolor="#ffcccc"
| 63
| March 17
| @ Indiana
| L 95–99
|
|
|
| Market Square Arena
| 28–35
|- align="center" bgcolor="#ffcccc"
| 64
| March 19
| Philadelphia
| L 89–94
|
|
|
| Capital Centre
| 28–36
|- align="center" bgcolor="#ffcccc"
| 65
| March 20, 19887:00 pm EST
| @ Detroit
| L 110–118
|
|
|
| Pontiac Silverdome22,075
| 28–37
|- align="center" bgcolor="#ffcccc"
| 66
| March 23
| @ Boston
| L 89–104
|
|
|
| Boston Garden
| 28–38
|- align="center" bgcolor="#ccffcc"
| 67
| March 24
| Atlanta
| W 94–91
|
|
|
| Capital Centre
| 29–38
|- align="center" bgcolor="#ccffcc"
| 68
| March 26
| New Jersey
| W 99–88
|
|
|
| Capital Centre
| 30–38
|- align="center" bgcolor="#ffcccc"
| 69
| March 30
| Cleveland
| L 96–107
|
|
|
| Capital Centre
| 30–39

|- align="center" bgcolor="#ccffcc"
| 70
| April 1, 19888:00 pm EST
| Dallas
| W 118–103
|
|
|
| Capital Centre13,783
| 31–39
|- align="center" bgcolor="#ccffcc"
| 71
| April 3
| @ New Jersey
| W 105–103
|
|
|
| Brendan Byrne Arena
| 32–39
|- align="center" bgcolor="#ccffcc"
| 72
| April 5
| @ Chicago
| W 105–94
|
|
|
| Chicago Stadium
| 33–39
|- align="center" bgcolor="#ffcccc"
| 73
| April 6
| @ Cleveland
| L 87–98
|
|
|
| Richfield Coliseum
| 33–40
|- align="center" bgcolor="#ccffcc"
| 74
| April 8
| Indiana
| W 107–100
|
|
|
| Capital Centre
| 34–40
|- align="center" bgcolor="#ffcccc"
| 75
| April 10
| New York
| L 98–118
|
|
|
| Capital Centre
| 35–40
|- align="center" bgcolor="#ccffcc"
| 76
| April 11
| @ Atlanta
| W 86–85
|
|
|
| The Omni
| 35–41
|- align="center" bgcolor="#ffcccc"
| 77
| April 13
| @ Philadelphia
| L 97–98 (OT)
|
|
|
| The Spectrum
| 35–42
|- align="center" bgcolor="#ccffcc"
| 78
| April 15
| @ New York
| W 106–97
|
|
|
| Madison Square Garden
| 36–42
|- align="center" bgcolor="#ccffcc"
| 79
| April 17
| Boston
| W 98–92
|
|
|
| Capital Centre
| 37–42
|- align="center" bgcolor="#ffcccc"
| 80
| April 20
| @ Milwaukee
| L 94–132
|
|
|
| MECCA Arena
| 37–43
|- align="center" bgcolor="#ffcccc"
| 81
| April 21, 19887:30 pm EDT
| Detroit
| L 87–99
|
|
|
| Capital Centre11,713
| 37–44
|- align="center" bgcolor="#ccffcc"
| 82
| April 23
| Atlanta
| W 106–96
|
|
|
| Capital Centre
| 38–44

Playoffs

|- align="center" bgcolor="#ffcccc"
| 1
| April 28, 19887:30 pm EDT
| @ Detroit
| L 87–96
| Jeff Malone (33)
| Moses Malone (13)
| John Williams (9)
| Pontiac Silverdome17,356
| 0–1
|- align="center" bgcolor="#ffcccc"
| 2
| April 30, 19888:00 pm EDT
| @ Detroit
| L 101–102
| Jeff Malone (31)
| Moses Malone (14)
| Jeff Malone (4)
| Pontiac Silverdome18,293
| 0–2
|- align="center" bgcolor="#ccffcc"
| 3
| May 2, 19888:00 pm EDT
| Detroit
| W 114–106 (OT)
| Jeff Malone (35)
| Moses Malone (9)
| Steve Colter (6)
| Capital Centre9,673
| 1–2
|- align="center" bgcolor="#ccffcc"
| 4
| May 4, 19888:00 pm EDT
| Detroit
| W 106–103
| Jeff Malone (25)
| Moses Malone (8)
| Darrell Walker (5)
| Capital Centre10,513
| 2–2
|- align="center" bgcolor="#ffcccc"
| 5
| May 8, 19883:30 pm EDT
| @ Detroit
| L 78–99
| Bernard King (18)
| Moses Malone (12)
| three players tied (3)
| Pontiac Silverdome18,403
| 2–3
|-

Player statistics

Season

Playoffs

Awards and records

Transactions

References

See also
 1987-88 NBA season

Washington Wizards seasons
Wash
Washing
Washing